Aniba was a village in Nubia, about 230 km south of Aswan. The place is today flooded by the Lake Nasser. In ancient times it was an important town and called Miam. The region around the town was one of the most fertile in Lower Nubia.

Earliest remains at Aniba date around 3000 BC and belong to the A-Group culture. A few cemeteries belonging to them were found. In the Middle Kingdom (about 2000 to 1700 BC) the region was ruled by Egyptians and in the Twelfth Dynasty there was built a fortress with a small town. At the beginning of the New Kingdom (about 1550 BC) the town was extended and was about 200 x 400 m big, with a wall and gates. During the New Kingdom the town grew and had several suburbs. Within the town proper stood the temple for Horus of Miam. When excavated it was only badly preserved but might be a foundation of the Middle Kingdom. North of the town there still stood a Nubian village belonging to the C-Group Culture. 

Around the town were huge cemeteries, some of them belonging to Nubians, but other tombs were erected in purely Egyptian style. It is not known for sure whether the people buried here were Nubians that adopted Egyptian culture or whether these were Egyptians. One rather simple tomb belonged to the Viceroy of Kush Pinehesy, an important person also known from other sources. 

A decorated rock cut tomb belonging to the deputy of Lower Nubia Pennut was relocated to New Amada as part of the International Campaign to Save the Monuments of Nubia. The latter office had most likely its headquarter in Aniba.

References 

Archaeological sites in Egypt
Former populated places in Egypt
Populated places established in the 3rd millennium BC
30th-century BC establishments